Jaganmohini is a 1951 Kannada film by D. Shankar Singh. It is about a seductress who falls in love with a prince and tries to steal him from his fiancée. It starred Harini who made her debut at the age of 14. Harini became the first Kannada heroine to wear a swimsuit on-screen. The movie was infamous for its censor problems. Despite this, the film become a box office hit and had a 100-days run. B. Vittalacharya remade it in Telugu in 1978 as Jaganmohini, which also went on to be remade in Tamil in 1978. Further, it was remade again in Tamil in 2009 as Jaganmohini.
 The film dubbed into Telugu and released in 1953.

Cast
 Srinivasa Rao
 U. Mahabala Rao
 Prathima Devi
 M. Jayashree
 M. S. Subbanna
 Harini

References

External links
 

1951 films
1950s Kannada-language films
Indian ghost films
Kannada films remade in other languages
Indian black-and-white films